Heciul Nou is a commune in Sîngerei District, Moldova. It is composed of two villages, Heciul Nou and Trifănești.

References

Communes of Sîngerei District